The MetalFront Fest is a two-day event celebrating the different styles of rock and metal music in the world on one stage in Yerevan, Armenia. It is the only festival of its kind in Armenia.

On November 26 and 27, 2008, Melechesh headlined the "MetalFront Fest 2008" in Armenia.

2008 

November 26:
 Arkona
 Mordab
 Stryfe
 Empyray
 5grs
 Scream of Silence

November 27:
 Melechesh
 Rossomahaar
 Sworn
 Dogma
 E.V.A
 Vaspooher
 Nairi

2009
The 2009 edition was cancelled.

See also
List of heavy metal festivals

References

External links 

 Metalfront Fest official website

Heavy metal festivals in Armenia
Rock festivals in Armenia
Entertainment events in Armenia
Music festivals established in 2008
Music festivals in Armenia